is a private university with campuses in Mizuho-ku, Nagoya and Toyota, Aichi in Japan. The predecessor of the school, Aichi Mizuho Junior College, a junior college, was established in 1940, and it became a four-year college in 1993.

References

External links
 Official website 

Educational institutions established in 1940
1940 establishments in Japan
Private universities and colleges in Japan
Universities and colleges in Nagoya
Toyota, Aichi